Babar Khan (born 18 September 1993) is a Pakistani first-class cricketer who plays for Hyderabad.

References

External links
 

1993 births
Living people
Pakistani cricketers
Hyderabad (Pakistan) cricketers
Cricketers from Hyderabad, Sindh